Bubacar Njie Kambi (born 14 March 1988), known as Bacari, is a Gambian footballer who plays as a forward for Andorran club UE Sant Julià.

Club career
Born in Mataró, Barcelona, Catalonia, to Gambian parents, Bacari played for four clubs as a youth (all in his native region, mainly RCD Espanyol), finishing his development at CE Mataró and starting his career as a central defender, being known as Buba. He made his senior debut with CE Premià, then spent two and a half seasons with Real Zaragoza and Real Valladolid's reserve teams.

Bacari made his official debut with Valladolid's main squad on 20 March 2011, coming on as a substitute for Álvaro Antón for the last eight minutes of the 1–0 Segunda División home victory over Girona FC. He contributed one goal in 131 minutes during the campaign, as the Castile and León side finished in seventh position.

In July 2011, Bacari signed with RCD Espanyol B. On 3 December he made his first La Liga appearance with the first team, replacing Álvaro Vázquez in the dying minutes of a 2–1 away defeat against Valencia CF. On 20 July of the following year, he joined CE L'Hospitalet in the Segunda División B.

After being Hospis second top scorer during his only season, only behind Sergio Cirio, Bacari moved to Bulgaria with PFC Cherno More Varna. On 30 May 2015, he scored a last-minute equalising goal in the Bulgarian Cup Final against PFC Levski Sofia to force extra time; his team went on to win 2–1. On 29 May 2017, after four First Professional Football League campaigns and an average of five goals, his contract was terminated by mutual consent. 

Bacari returned to Spain and its third tier in the 2018 January transfer window, agreeing to a deal at San Fernando CD. He continued to play in the lower leagues the following years, with Real Balompédica Linense and UE Vilassar de Mar.

International career
Bacari made his debut for Gambia on 4 June 2016, starting in a 0–4 home loss against South Africa in the 2017 Africa Cup of Nations qualifiers.

Club statistics

HonoursCherno More'
Bulgarian Cup: 2014–15

References

External links

La Segunda B profile 

1988 births
Living people
People from Mataró
People with acquired Gambian citizenship
Spanish people of Gambian descent
Spanish sportspeople of African descent
Sportspeople from the Province of Barcelona
Spanish footballers
Gambian footballers
Footballers from Catalonia
Association football forwards
La Liga players
Segunda División players
Segunda División B players
Tercera División players
CE Mataró players
CE Premià players
Real Zaragoza B players
Real Valladolid Promesas players
Real Valladolid players
RCD Espanyol B footballers
RCD Espanyol footballers
CE L'Hospitalet players
San Fernando CD players
Real Balompédica Linense footballers
UE Vilassar de Mar players
First Professional Football League (Bulgaria) players
PFC Cherno More Varna players
Primera Divisió players
UE Sant Julià players
The Gambia international footballers
Gambian expatriate footballers
Expatriate footballers in Spain
Expatriate footballers in Bulgaria
Expatriate footballers in Andorra
Gambian expatriate sportspeople in Spain
Gambian expatriate sportspeople in Bulgaria
Gambian expatriate sportspeople in Andorra